The traditional Chinese calendar divides a year into 24 solar terms. Xiǎomǎn, Shōman, Soman, or Tiểu mãn is the 8th solar term. It begins when the Sun reaches the celestial longitude of 60° and ends when it reaches the longitude of 75°. It more often refers in particular to the day when the Sun is exactly at the celestial longitude of 60°. In the Gregorian calendar, it usually begins around 21 May and ends around 5 June (6 June East Asia time).

Date and time

References

08
Summer